Couy Dale Griffin (born 1973) is a former politician who served from 2019 to 2022 as a county commissioner for District 2 of Otero County, New Mexico, which covers Tularosa, Three Rivers, La Luz, the western parts of Alamogordo, and the Mescalero Apache Reservation. In September 2022, Griffin was removed from office under the Disqualification Clause of the Fourteenth Amendment to the United States Constitution due to his actions in the January 6 United States Capitol attack. He is a member of the Republican Party.

Political career
In 2018, incumbent district 2 commissioner Susan Flores did not seek re-election, and Griffin joined the race to succeed her. On June 5, Griffin won the Republican primary with 708 votes (55%) against Christopher Rupp and Gregory Bose, who garnered 252 (20%) and 317 (25%) votes respectively. Griffin won the general election on November 6, 2018, with 3,090 votes (65%) against Democrat Christopher Jones with 1,635 votes. He took office in January 2019.

In 2021, a committee began circulating a petition to recall Griffin from office, accusing him of missing numerous county meetings, improperly filing a travel voucher, acting in a way that got him banned from the Mescalero Apache Reservation, and using county resources to further his group Cowboys for Trump. The committee fell short of the required signatures, only getting 1,229 of the required 1,574 signatures by the September 29 deadline.

Citing lingering concerns of fraud in the 2020 presidential election, the county commissioners hired a firm run by election conspiracy promoter Shiva Ayyadurai, who had worked on the 2021 Maricopa County presidential ballot audit. As with Maricopa County's audit of the election results, no evidence of fraud was found in the results for Otero County. Nonetheless, in January 2022, Griffin and the two other Otero County commissioners refused to certify the official 2022 election results for their county. New Mexico secretary of state Maggie Toulouse Oliver then sued the commission to complete their certification duty. Subsequently, the New Mexico Supreme Court ordered the commission to certify the election. The two other commissioners relented and complied, enacting the certification via a majority vote, but Griffin refused, asserting, "It’s not based on any facts. It’s only based on my gut feeling and my own intuition, and that’s all I need."

PAC 
Griffin is the founder of the activist group Cowboys for Trump. Originally it had 13 members. Members of the PAC rode horseback to political events and protests.

Legal issues

Travel voucher submitted 
In September 2019, Griffin drove from New Mexico to Washington, D.C. to attend a conference representing Otero County. During the trip he towed his horse in a trailer. During the same trip he also traveled to New York City to participate in a September 11 parade in his capacity as a member of Cowboys For Trump. Upon completion of this trip Griffin submitted a travel voucher to the county to cover the entire cost of his travel expenses, which included a per diem and mileage at a cost of $3,247.48. The county finance director approved the voucher without verifying county policy on travel expenses. The county then approved increasing the District 2 Commissioner travel allotment to account for the expense of Griffin's trip that exceeded existing funds. 

Citizens of the county discovered that the travel voucher violated county policy and that reimbursement should have only been for the cost to travel by air to Washington, D.C. and the per diem allotment for the two days he was there for the conference. As a result, Griffin repaid the entirety of the travel voucher from donations received from local business owners. The state auditor was made aware of the violations and did an audit on county finances.

Failure to register as PAC 
During the investigation by the state auditor into the travel voucher issue, it was discovered that Cowboys for Trump was not registered as a political action committee (PAC), but instead it was registered as a Limited Liability Corporation. The Secretary of State of New Mexico was notified and Cowboys for Trump was required to register as a PAC. They in turn sued the secretary of state declaring they were not a PAC. The court system sided with the secretary of state and declared that Cowboys for Trump had to register as a PAC.

Criminal charges were filed against Griffin for failing to register the group as a political action committee. The trial is set to begin in September 2022.

Arrest 

On January 6, 2021, Griffin participated in the attack on the United States Capitol, climbing over barriers and walls to gain access to a restricted area of the grounds. Later that month, Griffin spoke during a recorded commission meeting stating he was going to go back to D.C. with his firearms for the inauguration of Joe Biden. Upon his return to D.C. on January 17, 2021, Griffin was arrested and charged with trespassing and disorderly conduct. Due to refusal to submit to Covid testing in the jail, Griffin spent days in solitary confinement. He was released from jail on February 5, 2021. The trial took place on March 22, 2022, with Judge Trevor McFadden presiding. 

Griffin was found guilty on the trespassing charge, but was acquitted of the disorderly conduct charge. He was sentenced to 14 days in jail (that was satisfied by time served), a $3000 fine, 60 days of community service, and supervised release for a duration of one year.

Removal from office 
Subsequent to his 2022 conviction for the trespassing charge, a suit was filed by the group, Citizens for Responsibility and Ethics in Washington (CREW), and the residents of New Mexico under Section 3 of the Fourteenth Amendment to the United States Constitution that would bar him from holding a public office for life due to his participation in insurrection. 

Following the Disqualification Clause of the Fourteenth Amendment, District Court Judge Francis J. Mathew removed Griffin from public office on September 6, 2022, due to his participation in insurrection. The debarment from holding public office for insurrection is "for life", he may never hold a public office again unless the debarment is overruled by a higher court or an Act of Congress. Removal of Griffin from his office marked the first instance of a democratically-elected official being disqualified from holding public office under the constitutional provision since the disqualification of the socialist, Victor Berger, in 1919 by a special committee of Congress.

Griffin appealed the case to the New Mexico Supreme Court, which dismissed the appeal on procedural grounds.

In October 2022, New Mexico governor Michelle Lujan Grisham appointed Stephanie DuBois to Griffin's vacant seat on the commission. DuBois owns a dog grooming business and formerly served as chair of the Otero County Democratic Party. Republicans criticized Lujan Grisham for appointing a Democrat to a seat which had been Republican-held. DuBois ran for a full term in the November 2022 election but was defeated by Republican Amy Barela, a car salvage business owner and former chair of the Otero County Republican Party.

References 

1973 births
Living people
Convicted participants in the January 6 United States Capitol attack
New Mexico Republicans
New Mexico politicians convicted of crimes
County commissioners in New Mexico
People from Otero County, New Mexico
Far-right politicians in the United States